Karanasa is an Old World genus of subfamily Satyrinae (family Nymphalidae).

Species
In alphabetical order:
Karanasa abramovi (Erschoff, 1884)
Karanasa alpherakyi Avinov, 1910
Karanasa bolorica (Grum-Grshimailo, 1888)
Karanasa decolorata (Staudinger, 1901)
Karanasa hoffmanni (Christoph, 1893)
Karanasa huebneri (C. & R. Felder, [1867])
Karanasa incerta Bogdanov, 1997
Karanasa josephi (Staudinger, 1882)
Karanasa kasakstana O. Bang-Haas, 1936
Karanasa kirgisorum Avinov et Sweadner, 1951
Karanasa latifasciata (Grum-Grshimailo, 1902)
Karanasa leechi (Grum-Grshimailo, 1890)
Karanasa maureri Avinov & Sweadner, 1951
Karanasa modesta Moore, 1893
Karanasa moorei (Evans, 1912)
Karanasa pamira (Staudinger, 1887)
Karanasa puengeleri A. Bang-Haas, 1910
Karanasa regeli (Alpheraky, 1881)
Karanasa straminea Bogdanov, 1997
Karanasa talastauana O. Bang-Haas, 1927
Karanasa tancrei (Grum-Grshimailo, 1898)
Karanasa wilkinsi (Erschoff, 1884)

References

Russian insects
ToL

Satyrini
Butterfly genera
Taxa named by Frederic Moore